Pervouralsk New Pipe Plant is a steel pipe-producing plant based in the city of Pervouralsk, Sverdlovsk Oblast. As of 2016, the plant is part of the ChelPipe Group and is considered one of the major producers of pipes for the Russian market. 
 
The plant produces pipes of over 25 thousand types and sizes from some 200 grades of carbon, alloyed and stainless steel complying with 34 Russian and 25 foreign standards.

As of 2014, the plant employed about 9 thousand people. 

The floor area of the plant is about 60 square kilometers, spread over 9 main and 30 auxiliary shops.

History

The city of Pervouralsk had its beginning as an industrial site. In 1732 the Vasilyevo-Shaitansky Iron Works was launched, laying the foundation for the future city. In 1920 this plant produced its first seamless drawn pipe, and in 1921 was renamed First Ural Seamless Drawn Pipe Plant. However, the plant lacked the equipment necessary for the production of a wide range of tubing on a large scale.

In 1930 the Soviet government decided to build a new pipe-making plant in the city. The construction of the New Pipe Plant started in 1931, the launch took place in 1934. Reflecting the changes, the First Ural Seamless Drawn Pipe Plant was renamed Old Pipe Plant in 1932.

In 1936 the plant launched Mill 220, unofficially called "Big Stiefel" after its designer Ralph Stiefel (1862-1938), the US engineer who invented the plug rolling process (also known as the Stiefel rolling process).

In February 1939 the plant launched Mill 140, unofficially called "Little Stiefel".

In 1941, at the beginning of the Great Patriotic War, the New Pipe Plant received production equipment evacuated from plants located in southern and western regions of the country. The output of the plant grew fivefold during the war.

In 1973 the Old Pipe Plant was amalgamated into the New Pipe Plant, becoming its subsidiary.

In 2005 the New Pipe Plant was bought by the Chelyabinsk Pipe Group.

In 2009 the plant launched the Finishing Center that produces pipes for the oil industry.

In 2012 the plant launched Iron Ozone 32, an arc-furnace melting complex. This has allowed the plant to produce high-quality steel billet in-house, for use in pipe production.

Films

 1975 Retaliatory Measure (aka... Ответная Мера) a Cold War political drama about German-Soviet natural gas pipeline (Deutsch-sowjetische Röhren-Erdgas-Geschäfte) starring Petr Shelokhonov, Natalya Fateyeva and Heino Mandri,  

Pervouralsk
Industry in Russia
Steel companies of Russia
Companies based in Sverdlovsk Oblast
Manufacturing companies of the Soviet Union